Arundinella is a widespread genus of plants in the grass family, common in many tropical and subtropical regions.

 Species

 formerly included
see Alloteropsis Danthoniopsis Dilophotriche Jansenella Loudetia Trichopteryx

See also
 List of Poaceae genera

References

Panicoideae
Poaceae genera